The men's shot put event  at the 1978 European Athletics Indoor Championships was held on 12 March in Milan.

Results

References

Shot put at the European Athletics Indoor Championships
Shot